Elizabeth Wragge (September 22, 1918 - October 2002) was an actress who appeared on more than 10,000 old-time radio programs in addition to working in other media. She was sometimes billed as Elizabeth Wragge.

Early years
Elizabeth Wragge was born in New York City. Her mother was a star in opera in Holland. Wragge graduated from the Professional Children's School, after which she attended the David Mannes School of Music. She was a model before she began working in radio.

Radio
In 1927, Wragge appeared in Gold Spot Pals, an NBC program that may have been the first commercial program that used child actors. She also acted as a child on other programs, including Mary and Bob's True  Stories, an anthology series on which she portrayed Mary. Perhaps her best known role on radio was portraying Peggy Young Trent, sister of the title character in the soap opera Pepper Young's Family. She also acted on other programs of that era, including Lux Radio Theatre, March of Time, Texaco Star Theatre, and We the People.

Stage
Wragge's Broadway credits (billed as Elizabeth Wragge) included Up the Line (1926), The Silver Box (1927), and Dead End (1935). 
She also toured in musical troupes and acted in local and regional theaters, including the Allenberry Playhouse.

Film
When she was 3 years old, Wragge acted in the silent film Yolanda. As an adult, she did dubbing for Italian films.

Television
On television, Wragge had running parts on The Brighter Day, Love of Life, and The Secret Storm. She also appeared on Armstrong Circle Theatre, and in the "Flight Thirteen" episode of Fireside Theatre on January 2, 1951.

Personal life
In January 1951, Wragge married actor Walter Brooke, they had two children Thomas Brooke and Christina Brooke.

References
 

1918 births
2002 deaths
20th-century American actresses
American child actresses
American film actresses
American radio actresses
American stage actresses
American television actresses
Actresses from New York City